Galax Commercial Historic District is a national historic district located at Galax, Virginia. The district encompasses 67 contributing buildings in the central business district of Galax. A few of the buildings
are one-story storefronts, but a majority of the buildings are two-story commercial buildings with
either apartments or offices located on the second floor. The majority of the buildings were built in
the 1920s.  Notable buildings include the old fire station (c. 1920), Colonial Theater (1930), Waugh Department Store (1904), Rex Theater (1938), and Galax Municipal Building (1908).

It was listed on the National Register of Historic Places in 2002, with a boundary increase in 2008.

References

Historic districts on the National Register of Historic Places in Virginia
Buildings and structures in Galax, Virginia
National Register of Historic Places in Galax, Virginia